Tabernaemontana alba, the white milkwood, is a species of plant in the family Apocynaceae. It is found in Central America, Mexico, Florida, Cuba, and Colombia.

References

alba
Taxa named by Philip Miller